WBHY (840 AM, "Christian 840") is a radio station broadcasting a Christian radio format. Licensed to Mobile, Alabama, United States, the station serves the greater Mobile area.  The station is currently owned by Goforth Media, Inc. and features programming from the Salem Radio Network.

The station was assigned the WBHY call letters by the Federal Communications Commission on December 23, 1984.

References

External links
WBHY official website

FCC History Cards for WBHY

BHY
BHY
Talk radio stations in the United States
Radio stations established in 1984
BHY